was the pen-name of Japanese author Viscount Kinoshita Toshiharu, noted for his tanka poetry, active in Meiji period and Taishō period Japan.

Early life
Kinoshita was born in what is now part of Okayama city, Okayama Prefecture, and was a direct lineal descendant of a brother-in-law of Toyotomi Hideyoshi. His uncle, Kinoshita Toshiyasu, was the 13th and last daimyō of Ashimori han (25,000 koku). After the Meiji Restoration, he was given the title of viscount (shishaku) under the kazoku peerage system.  When he died, his nephew Kinoshita Rigen, only 5 years old, succeeded to the main family as Viscount Kinoshita.  Kinoshita would have thus been a daimyō if the Tokugawa shogunate had lasted only a few years longer. Kinoshita attended the Gakushūin Peers' School, where he was a classmate of Mushanokōji Saneatsu. He subsequently graduated from the Literature Department of Tokyo Imperial University, where his classmates included Shiga Naoya, and he was a student of the poet Nobutsuna Sasaki.

Literary career
Kinoshita was a co-founder of the Shirakabaha ("White Birch") Society, along with Shiga Naoya and Mushanokōji Saneatsu in 1910. He contributed extensively to the society's literary magazine, with elegant tanka verses, written in an easy-to-understand colloquial language. Kinoshita married a fellow student in 1911, the same year that he graduated, and had a son the following year. However, his son soon died; Kinoshita would father two more sons and one daughter, but only the third son survived. From 1912-1916, Kinoshita taught at a junior high school in the Mejiro neighborhood of Tokyo.

Kinoshita published numerous anthologies of his verses, including Kogyoku ("Red Ball", 1919) and Ichiro ("One Alley", 1924). He joined the staff of the Araragi literary magazine in 1923.

Kinoshita moved to Kamakura, Kanagawa Prefecture in 1919, as the sea air had a reputation for being good for lung disorders, and which was a favorite residence for many of the Shirakaba authors. However, he was diagnosed with tuberculosis in 1922 and died on February 15, 1924. His ashes were divided between the Kinoshita family temple of Daiko-ji in Okayama and Yanaka Cemetery in Tokyo.

See also
Japanese literature
List of Japanese authors

References
Frédéric, Louis. Japan Encyclopedia. Harvard University Press (2002)

External links

e-texts of works at Aozora Bunko

Notes

1886 births
1925 deaths
Kazoku
Shirakaba-ha
People from Okayama
People from Kamakura
20th-century deaths from tuberculosis
University of Tokyo alumni
Tuberculosis deaths in Japan
20th-century Japanese poets